Anna Ivanovna Kuzmina (3 March 1933 – 25 November 2017) was a Yakut Russian actress and author of the Soviet era and after. She was born in the Khangalassky District, Russia. For her work she was named an Honored Artist of the RSFSR (1982) and People's Artist of the Republic of Sakha (2003).

Kuzmina was a 1955 graduate of the Sakha Republic branch of the Moscow Theater School, specializing in drama and film. In that year she began working at the theater in Yakutsk, today the Sakha Academic Theater. She was known for her role in the television series Umnullubat sulustar ("Unfading Stars"); films in which she starred include Motuo, Taiwan Island and Yalylyylar. During her career she was named a deputy to the 8th Convocation of the Supreme Soviet of the Yakut ASSR; she was also a member of the Higher Council of Elders of the Sakha Republic. In 2010 she published a book about theater in the Sakha Republic. Kuzmina was married to Mikhail Gogolev.
She died in Yakutsk.

References

External links
 Кузьмина Анна Ивановна

1933 births
2017 deaths
People from the Sakha Republic
Yakut people
20th-century Russian actresses
21st-century Russian women writers
Russian film actresses
Russian stage actresses
Russian television actresses
Soviet stage actresses
Soviet women in politics
Honored Artists of the RSFSR